Abdur Rehman Hashim Syed, also known as Pasha, is a retired Major in the Pakistan army, accused of involvement with terrorism. He is listed on the NIA Most Wanted list.

Biography
Abdur Rehman retired in 2007 from the Pakistan army as a Major.
He worked closely with Lashkar-e-Taiba and coordinated the activities of a Chicago man, David Headley. He was arrested in 2009 in Pakistan on unspecified charges and later released.

An Associated Press story on 24 November 2009 said that five Pakistan army officers, including a retired brigadier and two active lieutenant colonels, had been detained for questioning in Pakistan.  They had all been in telephone contact with Headley. But the next day, Pakistan military spokesman Athar Abbas said that "security agencies" had only detained a single former army major in connection with the FBI case.

Accusations by the FBI
A joint FBI complaint against a Chicago man David Headley and Abdur Rehman charges Rehman with conspiracy in planning to attack the Danish newspaper Jyllands Posten and its employees.

Headley is accused of reporting to Ilyas Kashmiri, an Islamic militant commander associated with both Al Qaeda and Lashkar-e-Taiba, to conduct surveillance of public areas in Mumbai in preparation for the 2008 Mumbai attacks. Kashmiri was also a former Pakistani military officer. Kashmiri was killed in a drone strike in Pakistan in June 2011.

Accusations by the NIA
Another individual named in the FBI complaint as "LeT member A", a member of Lashkar-e-Taiba, gave instructions to Headley on which locations to scout for future attacks, including both the Danish newspaper and locations in India, such as the National Defense College in New Delhi.  Indian intelligence officials believe that LeT member A is Sajid Mir, Lashkar's head of international operations and surveyed targets in India as a cricket fan. Sajid Mir was a ranking member of the Pakistani army until several years ago.

See also
 List of fugitives from justice who disappeared

References

Living people
Fugitives wanted by India
Fugitives wanted on terrorism charges
Islamic terrorism in the United States
Participants in the 2008 Mumbai attacks
Pakistan Army officers
Terrorism in India
Year of birth missing (living people)
People charged with terrorism
Lashkar-e-Taiba members
Pakistani Islamists